Pasteurella bettyae is a bacterium associated with human Bartholin gland abscess and finger infections.

References

Further reading

External links

LPSN
Type strain of Pasteurella bettyae at BacDive -  the Bacterial Diversity Metadatabase

Pasteurellales
Bacteria described in 1990